Kawambwa District is a district of Zambia, located in Luapula Province. The capital lies at Kawambwa, which lies at the intersection of three roads: D19, M13, and Kawambwa-Mbereshi. The Luapula River forms its boundary with the Democratic Republic of the Congo. As of the 2000 Zambian Census, the district had a population of 102,503 people. It consists of two constituencies, namely Kawambwa and Pambashe.

Climate change led to both floods and drought in Kawambwa District in 2008, thus hampering the activities of subsistence farmers.

Lusenga Plain National Park, which was converted from a hunting area, is an 880 square kilometer park in the district's northern corner.

References

Districts of Luapula Province